Vincent Gagnier (born July 21, 1993) is a Canadian professional freestyle skier. He won a gold medal at the Winter X Games XIX in January 2015, winning the Big Air competition ahead of Bobby Brown and Elias Ambühl.

References

External links
 
 

1993 births
Canadian male freestyle skiers
Living people
People from Victoriaville
Sportspeople from Quebec
X Games athletes